Robert Shaw (May 22, 1907 – July 9, 1972) was a United States district judge of the United States District Court for the District of New Jersey.

Education and career
He was born in Jersey City, New Jersey and attended high school in Paterson. He received a Bachelor of Laws from the New Jersey Law School (now Rutgers Law School) in 1932. He was in private practice in Newark, New Jersey from 1935 to 1962. He was a member of the New Jersey General Assembly from 1937 to 1938. He was in the United States Army during World War II from 1943 to 1945 and was a private serving in the South Pacific. While in the army, he did his initial training as a medic at the Medical Replacement Training Center, Fort Pickett, Virginia. He was Mayor of Caldwell Township (now Fairfield Township), New Jersey from 1955 to 1961.

Federal judicial service

On March 19, 1962, Shaw was nominated by President John F. Kennedy to a seat on the United States District Court for the District of New Jersey vacated by Judge William Francis Smith. Shaw was confirmed by the United States Senate on April 11, 1962, and received his commission on April 12, 1962. Shaw served in that capacity until his death on July 9, 1972.

References

Sources
 

1907 births
1972 deaths
Rutgers University alumni
Judges of the United States District Court for the District of New Jersey
United States district court judges appointed by John F. Kennedy
20th-century American judges
United States Army soldiers
Rutgers Law School alumni